Didier Kavumbangu (born 2 May 1988) is Burundian professional international footballer. He plays for Viktoria Otrokovice which playing in the MSFL as a striker.

Young Africans yesterday unveiled Burundian striker, Didier Kavumbangu who has joined the Jangwani-based club for the coming season.

He was called to Burundi national football team at the 2012 Africa Cup of Nations qualification and scored two goals for his team.

References

External links 
 
 
 Profile

1983 births
Living people
Sportspeople from Bujumbura
Association football midfielders
Expatriate footballers in Tanzania
Burundian footballers
Burundian expatriate footballers
Burundi international footballers
Young Africans S.C. players
Burundian expatriate sportspeople in Tanzania
Azam F.C. players
Atlético Olympic FC players
Tanzanian Premier League players